Die Hard Arcade, known as  in Japan, is an arcade beat 'em up video game released by Sega. It was the first beat 'em up to use texture-mapped 3D polygon graphics, and used a sophisticated move set by contemporary beat 'em up standards, often being likened to a fighting game in this respect. It also features quick time events, the ability to combine items to make more powerful weapons, and in two-player mode the ability to perform combined special moves and combos.

The game was published in cooperation with Fox Interactive and was a licensed product based on the Die Hard movie franchise. Because Sega did not hold the Japanese video game rights for Die Hard, in Japan the game was stripped of the Die Hard license and published as an original property.

Similarly to hit action films of the time, Die Hard Arcade is dominated by over-the-top, largely gore-free violence which is played for comedic effect. Released in 1996 for arcades, the game was ported to the Sega Saturn in 1997 and the PlayStation 2 (Japan only) in the Sega Ages line in 2006. A sequel, Dynamite Cop, was released for arcades and Dreamcast in 1998 without the Die Hard license.

Gameplay
Die Hard Arcade is a beat 'em up for one or two players, who play as either John McClane or Kris Thompsen (Bruno Delinger and Cindy Holiday in the Japanese version). Players fight their way through waves of enemies, using their fists, feet, and a variety of weapons that can be collected from enemies or the environment, from household items such as brooms and pepper shakers to high-damage missile launchers, submachine guns and anti-tank rifles. Items can be combined to make more powerful weapons, such as combining a spray and a lighter to make a flamethrower. Most weapons are automatically lost at the end of each action scene, but hand guns can be retained so long as they have ammunition remaining. The typical level structure is a number of minions the player must defeat in many rooms, followed by a boss. Quick Time Events are interspersed between many of the scenes. Failing a Quick Time Event results in either a loss of health, as is usual for QTEs, or an additional action scene which the players otherwise would not have to complete. Cut scenes are interspersed into the action.

In two-player cooperative mode, both players can work together with combined special moves and combos. The Saturn version also includes a port of Sega's 1979 arcade game Deep Scan, which can be used to gain extra credits. Unlike most arcade ports, no additional credits are provided for Deep Scan; losing a single life results in a game over.

Plot
In the English version, John McClane and Kris Thompsen (Bruno Delinger and Cindy Holiday) try to save the President's daughter, Caroline Powell, from terrorists. There are a number of bosses in the game, including a biker called Hog, a Mexican wrestler named Jocko, the twin team of Mr. Oishi (a sumo wrestler) and Mr. Tubbs (an army general), a nameless muscle-bound fire chief armed with tiny grenades, and two pairs of laser-shooting Spiderbots. The final boss, of which all the others are henchmen, is known as Wolf "White Fang" Hongo. At the end of the game, if both players are still alive, the two players will fight each other on the rooftop of the skyscraper to gain the sole appreciation of the President's daughter (similar to the ending of Double Dragon).

Development
Die Hard Arcade originated as a means for Sega to use existing resources: Sega had produced an excess inventory of ST-V arcade boards, and had acquired the Die Hard license but as yet had no Die Hard games in development. The game was created by AM1 and the US-based Sega Technical Institute (STI), with all work on the game taking place at STI's facilities. AM1 provided the engineering, design, and art, while STI provided art, design and animation. Die Hard Arcade was the final game developed by STI before the studio was dissolved. Previews reveal that up until shortly before the game's arcade release, the gameplay was strictly two dimensional, with characters only able to move along a single plane. The game was developed simultaneously for the ST-V Titan arcade system and Sega Saturn, but the home version was released later.

The Japanese version of Die Hard Arcade, Dynamite Deka, was followed by a sequel titled Dynamite Deka 2 for the arcade and Dreamcast. The sequel was released internationally as Dynamite Cop. In 2007, a remake of the second game was released in arcades (on NAOMI) under the name Dynamite Deka EX in Japan and Asian Dynamite in Europe and the USA. Bruno, from the original Japanese version, later appeared as a solo unit in the 2012 crossover role-playing game, Project X Zone, recolored to match his Dynamite Cop appearance in the Western releases. Because the character is based on John McClane, Bruno's likeness is modeled after Bruce Willis.

Reception

Die Hard Arcade achieved a certain degree of success upon release. In Japan, Game Machine listed Die Hard Arcade on their August 15, 1996 issue as being the second most-successful arcade game of the month. Computer and Video Games magazine gave the arcade game a positive review, comparing it favorably with the Streets of Rage series and comparing the moves and combos to the fighting game Virtua Fighter 2 (1994). Reviewing the arcade version, a Next Generation critic said Die Hard Arcade "breathes life into a dead-end genre", as the fighting moves are effective and far more abundant than in previous beat 'em ups, even discounting the acquirable weapons. He also found the graphics "lively", but criticized that it is often difficult to line up attacks with opponents, and the action is sometimes glitchy or sluggish. It was Sega's most successful US-produced arcade game up to that time.

Reviews for the Saturn port applauded its flawless conversion of the arcade version, variety of moves and combos, and selection of satisfying-to-use weapons, while criticizing the low longevity stemming from its short length, low difficulty, and limited replay value. Most critics asserted that even mildly-skilled players would beat the game within an hour, even without using the extra credits that can be earned by playing Deep Scan. Glenn Rubenstein of GameSpot disputed this, saying that most players would need credits from Deep Scan to have a reasonable chance of beating the game. Paul Glancey of Sega Saturn Magazine was particularly enthusiastic about the weapons, commenting that "there's not much to beat the thrill of smacking a terrorist right in his low brow with an antique grandfather clock". However, he stated that the game overall was "a fun fighting game that's especially suited for novice players, but it's too short lived for more experienced beat 'em up fans". Sushi-X of Electronic Gaming Monthly was also less than impressed, concluding: "Take away the humor, decent graphics and simple control, and you've got a bust". His three co-reviewers were more positive, with Crispin Boyer in particular calling the game "the slickest rip-off of Final Fight I've ever seen". GamePros The Rookie made little of Die Hard Arcades low longevity, deeming the game a welcome offering to enthusiasts of back-to-basics beat 'em up gameplay. A Next Generation critic noted the longevity as a major issue but likewise gave a firmly positive assessment: "Die Hard Arcade is designed for pure and simple action, and it delivers". Rubenstein similarly described it as "simple, violent, and easy. Basically, it's a blast".

GamesRadar ranked it number 25 on the list of the best Sega Saturn games, claiming that the "wide array of firearms and melee weapons helped amp up the arcade-style action".

References

External links
Dynamite Deka EX official website

Dia Hard Arcade at MobyGames

1996 video games
Arcade video games
Cooperative video games
Arcade
PlayStation 2 games
PlayStation Network games
Sega arcade games
Sega beat 'em ups
Sega Saturn games
Sega Technical Institute games
Fox Interactive games
Sega video games
Video games about police officers
Video games about terrorism
Video games based on films
Video games developed in the United States
Video games featuring female protagonists
Video games scored by Howard Drossin
3D beat 'em ups